Alexandru Dincă (December 18, 1945, Bucharest – April 30, 2012) was a former Romanian handball player who competed in the 1972 Summer Olympics.

In 1972 he won the bronze medal with the Romanian team. He played all six matches as goalkeeper.

References

External links 
 
 
 

1945 births
2012 deaths
Romanian male handball players
CSA Steaua București (handball) players
Olympic handball players of Romania
Olympic bronze medalists for Romania
Olympic medalists in handball
Medalists at the 1972 Summer Olympics
Handball players at the 1972 Summer Olympics